The discography of Jenni Vartiainen, a Finnish pop singer, consists of three studio albums, six singles, seven promotional singles and 10 music videos. According to Musiikkituottajat, she has sold over 330,000 records in Finland.

Studio albums

Compilation albums

Singles

Promotional singles

Other charted songs

Featured songs

Other appearances

Music videos

References

Discographies of Finnish artists
Discography
Pop music discographies